Ida Ladstätter (born 13 February 1965 in Sankt Jakob in Defereggen) is a retired Austrian alpine skier who competed in the 1988 Winter Olympics.

References

External links
 http://www.ski-db.com/db/profiles/ida_ladstaetter_aut_wldsid.asp
 http://data.fis-ski.com/dynamic/athlete-biography.html?sector=AL&listid=&competitorid=33426

1965 births
Living people
Austrian female alpine skiers
Olympic alpine skiers of Austria
Alpine skiers at the 1988 Winter Olympics